The following outline is provided as an overview of and topical guide to Cyprus:

Cyprus – Eurasian island country located in the Eastern Mediterranean Sea, east of Greece, south of Turkey, west of Syria and Lebanon, northwest of Israel and north of Egypt. Cyprus is the third largest island in the Mediterranean Sea and the Republic of Cyprus is a member state of the European Union.

General Reference

 Pronunciation:
 Common English country name: Cyprus
 Official English country name: The Republic of Cyprus
 Common endonym(s):  
 Official endonym(s):  
 Adjectival(s): Cypriot
 Demonym(s):
 Etymology: Name of Cyprus
 International rankings of Cyprus
 ISO country codes: CY, CYP, 196
 ISO region codes: See ISO 3166-2:CY
 Internet country code top-level domain: .cy

Geography of Cyprus

Geography of Cyprus
 Cyprus is: an island country
 Location:
 Northern Hemisphere and Eastern Hemisphere
 Atlantic Ocean
 Mediterranean Sea
 Eurasia (though not on the mainland)
 Europe
 Southern Europe
 Mediterranean Basin
 Time zone:  Eastern European Time (UTC+02), Eastern European Summer Time (UTC+03)
 Date and time notation in Cyprus
 Extreme points of Cyprus
 High:  Mount Olympus 
 Low:  Mediterranean Sea 0 m
 Land boundaries:  150 km
Dhekelia SBA 103 km
Akrotiri SBA 47 km
 Coastline:  648 km
 Population of Cyprus: 794,600 (January 1, 2008)  - 154th most populous country

 Area of Cyprus: 9,251 km2
 Atlas of Cyprus

Environment of Cyprus

 Climate of Cyprus
 Solar power in Cyprus
 Cyprus Mediterranean forests
 Wildlife of Cyprus
 Flora of Cyprus
 Fauna of Cyprus
 Birds of Cyprus
 Mammals of Cyprus

Natural geographic features of Cyprus

 Dams and reservoirs in Cyprus
 Islands of Cyprus
 Mountains of Cyprus
 Kyrenia Mountains
 Troodos Mountains
 Rivers of Cyprus
 World Heritage Sites in Cyprus

Regions of Cyprus

Administrative divisions of Cyprus

Administrative divisions of Cyprus
 Districts of Cyprus

Districts of Cyprus

Districts of Cyprus

Municipalities of Cyprus

 Capital of Cyprus: Nicosia
 Cities of Cyprus
 Ten city-kingdoms of Cyprus

Demography of Cyprus

Demographics of Cyprus

Government and politics of Cyprus

Politics of Cyprus
 Form of government: presidential representative democratic republic
 Capital of Cyprus: Nicosia
 Elections in Cyprus
 Political ideologies in Cyprus
 Liberalism in Cyprus
 Political issues in Cyprus
 Corruption in Cyprus
 Reduction of military conscription in Cyprus
 Political parties in Cyprus
 Taxation in Cyprus

Branches of the government of Cyprus

Government of Cyprus

Executive branch of the government of Cyprus

 Head of state: President of Cyprus, Dimitris Christofias
 Head of government: President of Cyprus, Dimitris Christofias
 Vice President of Cyprus
 Presidential Palace, Nicosia
 Cabinet of Cyprus
 List of Ministers of Communications and Works of Cyprus
 List of Ministers of Defence of Cyprus
 List of Ministers of Education and Culture of Cyprus
 List of Ministers of Finance of Cyprus
 List of Ministers of Foreign Affairs of Cyprus
 List of Ministers of Labour and Social Insurance of Cyprus

Legislative branch of the government of Cyprus

 Parliament of Cyprus (unicameral)
 House of Representatives of Cyprus

Judicial branch of the government of Cyprus

Court system of Cyprus
 Supreme Court of Cyprus

Foreign relations of Cyprus

Foreign relations of Cyprus
 Diplomatic missions in Cyprus
 Diplomatic missions of Cyprus
 United Nations Peacekeeping Force in Cyprus
 United Nations Buffer Zone in Cyprus
 Visa requirements for Cypriot citizens

International organization membership

The Republic of Cyprus is a member of:

Afro-Asian Peoples' Solidarity Organization (AAPSO)
Asian-African Legal Consultative Organization (AALCO)
Asian Organization of Supreme Audit Institutions (ASOSAI)
 Asian Parliamentary Assembly (APA)
Association of Asian Parliaments for Peace (AAPP)
Australia Group
Commonwealth of Nations
Council of Europe (CE)
Economic and Monetary Union (EMU)
European Bank for Reconstruction and Development (EBRD)
European Investment Bank (EIB)
European Union (EU)
Food and Agriculture Organization (FAO)
International Atomic Energy Agency (IAEA)
International Bank for Reconstruction and Development (IBRD)
International Chamber of Commerce (ICC)
International Civil Aviation Organization (ICAO)
International Criminal Court (ICCt)
International Criminal Police Organization (Interpol)
International Finance Corporation (IFC)
International Fund for Agricultural Development (IFAD)
International Hydrographic Organization (IHO)
International Labour Organization (ILO)
International Maritime Organization (IMO)
International Mobile Satellite Organization (IMSO)
International Monetary Fund (IMF)
International Olympic Committee (IOC)
International Organization for Migration (IOM)
International Organization for Standardization (ISO)
International Telecommunication Union (ITU)

International Telecommunications Satellite Organization (ITSO)
International Trade Union Confederation (ITUC)
Inter-Parliamentary Union (IPU)
Middle East Cancer Consortium (MECC)
Middle East Free Trade Area (US-MEFTA)
Multilateral Investment Guarantee Agency (MIGA)
Non-Aligned Movement (NAM) (guest)
Nuclear Suppliers Group (NSG)
Organisation internationale de la Francophonie (OIF) (associate member)
Organization for Security and Cooperation in Europe (OSCE)
Organisation for the Prohibition of Chemical Weapons (OPCW)
Organization of American States (OAS) (observer)
Permanent Court of Arbitration (PCA)
United Nations (Asian Group) (UN)
United Nations Conference on Trade and Development (UNCTAD)
United Nations Educational, Scientific, and Cultural Organization (UNESCO)
United Nations High Commissioner for Refugees (UNHCR)
United Nations Industrial Development Organization (UNIDO)
United Nations Interim Force in Lebanon (UNIFIL)
Universal Postal Union (UPU)
World Confederation of Labour (WCL)
World Customs Organization (WCO)
World Federation of Trade Unions (WFTU)
World Health Organization (WHO)
World Intellectual Property Organization (WIPO)
World Meteorological Organization (WMO)
World Tourism Organization (UNWTO)
World Trade Organization (WTO)

Law and order in Cyprus

Law of Cyprus
 Capital punishment in Cyprus
 Constitution of Cyprus
 Crime in Cyprus
 Human trafficking in Cyprus
 Human rights in Cyprus
 Abortion in Cyprus
 Freedom of religion in Cyprus
 Freedom of religion in Northern Cyprus
 LGBT rights in Cyprus
 Recognition of same-sex unions in Cyprus
 Law enforcement in Cyprus
 Cyprus Police
 Taxation in Cyprus

Military of Cyprus

Cypriot National Guard
 Command
 Commander-in-chief:
 Ministry of Defence of Cyprus
 Conscription in Cyprus
 Forces
 Army of Cyprus
 Navy of Cyprus
 Evangelos Florakis Naval Base
 Air Force of Cyprus
 Special forces of Cyprus
 Military history of Cyprus
 Military ranks of Cyprus

Local government in Cyprus

Local government in Cyprus

History of Cyprus

History of Cyprus

History of Cyprus, by period
 Timeline of Cypriot history
 List of years in Cyprus
 Prehistoric Cyprus
 Khirokitia
 Ancient history of Cyprus
 Ten city-kingdoms of Cyprus
 Cyprus in the Middle Ages
 Kingdom of Cyprus
 Venetian Cyprus
 Ottoman Cyprus
 History of Cyprus since 1878
 Cyprus Emergency (1955-1959)
 Cyprus crisis of 1963–64
 Turkish invasion of Cyprus (1974)
 Cyprus Missile Crisis (1997-1998)
 Evangelos Florakis Naval Base explosion (2011)
 2012–13 Cypriot financial crisis

History of Cyprus, by region

 History of Kyrenia
 History of Nicosia

History of Cyprus, by subject

 History of Armenians in Cyprus
 Earthquakes in Cyprus
 History of the Jews in Cyprus
 Massacres in Cyprus
 History of medicine in Cyprus
 Military history of Cyprus
 Armoured vehicles of the Cypriot National Guard
 History of nationality in Cyprus
 History of rail transport in Cyprus

Civilian casualties and displacements during the Cyprus conflict

Culture of Cyprus

Culture of Cyprus
 Architecture of Cyprus
 Castles in Cyprus
 Tallest buildings in Cyprus
 Cuisine of Cyprus
 Cypriot wine
 Festivals in Cyprus
 International Festival of Ancient Greek Drama, Cyprus
 Wine Festival
 Languages of Cyprus
 Cypriot Greek
 Cypriot Sign Language
 Cypriot Turkish
 Monuments in Cyprus
 Armenian monuments in Cyprus
 Museums in Cyprus
 National symbols of Cyprus
 Coat of arms of Cyprus
 Flag of Cyprus
 National anthem of Cyprus
 Non-governmental organisations in Cyprus
 Prostitution in Cyprus
 Public holidays in Cyprus
 Records of Cyprus
 Scouting and guiding in Cyprus
 Welfare state in Cyprus
 World Heritage Sites in Cyprus

Art in Cyprus

 Art in Cyprus
 Painters from Cyprus
 Cinema of Cyprus
 Literature of Cyprus
 Music of Cyprus
 Cyprus in the Eurovision Song Contest
 Theatre in Cyprus
 Theatrical Organization of Cyprus

People of Cyprus

People of Cyprus
 Ethnic groups in Cyprus
 Armenians in Cyprus
 Greek Cypriots
 Indians in Cyprus
 Lebanese people in Cyprus
 Maronites in Cyprus
 Russians in Cyprus
 Turkish Cypriots
 Vietnamese people in Cyprus
 Women in Cyprus

Religion in Cyprus

Religion in Cyprus
 Christianity in Cyprus
 Catholic Church in Cyprus
 Hinduism in Cyprus
 Islam in Cyprus
 Mosques in Cyprus
 Judaism in Cyprus
 History of the Jews in Cyprus
 Sikhism in Cyprus
 Armenian religion in Cyprus

Sports in Cyprus

Sports in Cyprus
 Football in Cyprus
 Football clubs in Cyprus
 Football stadiums in Cyprus
 Cyprus at the Olympics
 Cyprus Cycling Federation
 Rugby union in Cyprus

Economy and infrastructure of Cyprus

Economy of Cyprus

 Economic rank, by nominal GDP (2007): 89th (eighty-ninth)
 Agriculture in Cyprus
 Banking in Cyprus
 Central Bank of Cyprus
 Banks in Cyprus
 Companies of Cyprus
 Currency of Cyprus: Euro (see also: Euro topics)
 Cypriot euro coins
 Previous currency: Cypriot pound
 ISO 4217: EUR
 Mining in Cyprus
 Poverty in Cyprus
 Cyprus Stock Exchange
 Tourism in Cyprus
 Visa policy of Cyprus

Communications in Cyprus 

Communications in Cyprus
 Internet in Cyprus
 Media in Cyprus
 Newspapers
Radio stations
 Television in Cyprus
 Cyprus Postal Services
 Postal codes in Cyprus
 Telephone numbers in Cyprus

Energy in Cyprus 

Energy in Cyprus
 Electricity Authority of Cyprus
 Dams and reservoirs in Cyprus
 Energy policy of Cyprus
 Oil industry in Cyprus
 Solar power in Cyprus

Transport in Cyprus 

Transport in Cyprus
 Airports in Cyprus
 Rail transport in Cyprus
 Roads and motorways in Cyprus
 Ship transport in Cyprus
 Lighthouses in Cyprus

Education in Cyprus

Education in Cyprus
 Armenian education in Cyprus
 Schools in Cyprus
 Universities and colleges in Cyprus
 Open University of Cyprus
 Secondary education in Cyprus

Health in Cyprus

Health in Cyprus
 Health care in Cyprus
 History of medicine in Cyprus
 Hospitals in Cyprus

See also

Cyprus
 
 
 
 
 Index of Cyprus-related articles
 List of international rankings
 Member state of the Commonwealth of Nations
 Member state of the European Union
 Member state of the United Nations
 Outline of Akrotiri and Dhekelia
 Outline of Asia
 Outline of Europe
 Outline of geography
 Outline of Northern Cyprus

References

External links

Island Jewels: Understanding Ancient Cyprus and Crete Biblical Archaeology Review

Air Ambulance Cyprus
Air Ambulance International. HI Flying aviation group

 Government
Cyprus Trade Centres Worldwide
Cyprus High Commission Trade Centre - London
Cypriot Diaspora Project
Republic of Cyprus - English Language
Constitution of the Republic of Cyprus
Press and Information Office
Annan Plan at annanplan.com

 General information
CIA World Factbook - Cyprus
US State Department - Cyprus includes Background Notes, Country Study and major reports
"The Cyprus Conflict" An extensive educational web site dedicated to the Cyprus Conflict

The UN in Cyprus
Top of the class - Cyprus Internet Directory

 Official publications
The British government's Foreign Affairs Committee report on Cyprus.
Letter by the President of the Republic, Mr Tassos Papadopoulos, to the U.N. Secretary-General, Mr Kofi Annan, dated 7 June, which circulated as an official document of the U.N. Security Council
Legal Issues arising from certain population transfers and displacements on the territory of the Republic of Cyprus in the period since 20 July 1974
Address to Cypriots by President Papadopoulos (FULL TEXT)
The Republic of Cyprus Press and Information Office, Aspects of the Cyprus Problem
ΝΟΗΤΙΚΗ ΑΝΤΙΣΤΑΣΙΣ - Noitiki Antistasis, Non-affiliated news website focusing mainly on the effect of globalization and foreign interests on the Cyprus problem
European Court of Human Rights Case of Cyprus v. Turkey (Application no. 25781/94)

Cyprus